Sky Burger is a strategy video game developed by NimbleBit for iOS and Android devices. The game was originally released in 2009 and is no longer available for download.

Gameplay

In Sky Burger, players stack ingredients to fill specific orders and complete a burger. The ingredients, patty, cheese, lettuce, pickle, onion, and tomato, fall from the sky, and the player must tilt the screen left or right to catch them. Once the order is filled, the player gets money and a tip and then continues making more burgers. The tip is based upon the cost of the burger and how well the player did catching the ingredients and avoiding the unwanted ingredients.

The burgers which the players assemble are randomly selected, and one burger called the "Sky Burger" lets the player stack as many ingredients as they are able to with no limit as long as the player avoids the falling hamburger buns.

The difficulty becomes harder as the player successfully makes consecutive orders. Ingredients, as well as the hamburger buns, fall much more quickly. The required amount of ingredients is higher. However, if a player fails to complete an unfinished order due to accidentally collecting a hamburger bun when they have not collected all of the ingredients needed to make that order, the difficulty is set back to the beginning, and again becomes harder as the player progresses.

Reception

The game is rated about 4/5 stars by users on the App Store. On the Android Store it received a 4.2/5 from users.

Chris Barylick of Macworld mentioned that the game "makes great use of tilt controls for the iPhone and iPod touch," but "the game can feel a bit directionless, which both works for and against it."

References

External links
NimbleBit Official Website
Apple App Store
Google Play

2009 video games
Android (operating system) games
IOS games
NimbleBit games
Single-player video games
Strategy video games
Video games about food and drink
Video games developed in the United States
Accelerometer-based mobile games